DSN may refer to:

Technology

Computing & Internet
 Data set (IBM mainframe) Name, the name of a computer file having a record organization
 Data source name, a data structure used to describe a connection to a data source
 Delivery Status Notification message, an automated electronic mail message about a delivery problem
 Distributed social network, a social network that is decentralised and distributed across multiple providers
 International Conference on Dependable Systems and Networks
 .DSN (design file), industry-standard import file format of Specctra-compatible autorouters

Military and Intelligence
 Defense Switched Network, a communications network operated by the United States Department of Defense
 DSN DASH, the U.S. Navy's Drone Anti-Submarine Helicopter.
 DSN Satellite Network, a Japanese military X band satellite communications network operated by DSN Corporation
 Direktion für Staatsschutz und Nachrichtendienst (Directorate for National Security and Intelligence), an Austrian intelligence agency

Space
 Deep Space Network, a communication network

Media and Entertainment
 Direct Sports Network, a sports centered digital media company, based in Irvine, California

Others
 Deutsche Schulen Nigeria, a school system which includes the Deutsche Schule Abuja
 IATA code for Ordos Ejin Horo Airport, China
Star Trek: Deep Space Nine, a science fiction television program
 Doctor of Science in Nursing